OCEAN Design Research Association focuses on interdisciplinary research by design in the intersection between architecture, urban- and landscape design, industrial design, and a variety of related creative disciplines. The not-for-profit association is registered in Norway.

History 
In 1994 OCEAN was founded by Michael Ulrich Hensel, Ulrich Königs, Tom Verebes and Bostjan Vuga as a think-tank for experimental design in architecture located in London. In 1995 the group expanded into a network with groups in Cologne, Helsinki, London, Ljubljana and Oslo. In 1998 the groups in Cologne, Helsinki and Oslo fused and operated under the name OCEAN NORTH until 2006. During the same year the revision of the network and its expansion began. In result OCEAN was renamed and restructured as an independent and not-for-profit design research association registered in Norway in 2008.

Today OCEAN conducts a wide scope of research by design, bringing together the disciplines of architecture, urban and landscape design, industrial and product design, engineering, biology, ecology, micro-climatology and musical composition. The objective of the association is to initiate, undertake, promote and host collaboration in design research with the aim for improve the built environment and anthroposphere, by means of developing and exploring new paradigms to design that are heterogeneous, performative, context-specific, and culturally, socially and environmentally sustainable. The network is active in the intersection between practice, research and education.

Current research areas include Architecture and Biology, Assembly Buildings, Auxiliary Architectures, Computational Design and Augmented Reality, Grounds and Envelopes, Matter and Energy Interaction, Performance-oriented Design, Systems Oriented Design, Research by Design, Systems-oriented Design, and Sound Environments.

The work of OCEAN has been published and exhibited widely, including the Venice Biennale of Architecture 2002 and 2004, and the Beijing Architectural Biennale 2008. Among its best known work to date is the ‘World Centre for Human Concerns’ designed for the exhibition ‘A New World Trade Centre’, exhibited at the Max Protetch Gallery in New York, the American Pavilion at the Venice Biennale of Architecture 2002 and the German Museum of Architecture. The scheme for a 'World Center for Human Concerns' pointed towards a new institution that could provide representation to all people above and beyond nation-state representation. The intention was to project a forum for political processes, with the aim to overcome violent conflict in result of the existence of multiple forms of acceptable representation.

OCEAN members 

 Dr. Natasha Barrett
 Prof. Guillem Baraut Bover
 Dr. Richard Bonser
 Christina Doumpioti
 Hülya Ertaş
 Isak Worre Foged 
 Prof. Dr. Michael Ulrich Hensel- Founding and current Chairman 
 Prof. Christian Hermansen
 Dr. Pavel Hladik
 Joakim Hoen
 Nathaniel Kolbe
 Tom Lea
 Prof. Dr. Andrew Morrisson
 Prof. Dr. Frederik Nilsson
 Dr. Janne Reitan
 Dr. Jonas Runberger
 Prof. Dr. Birger Ragnvald Sevaldson- Current Secretary
 Prof. Søren Sørensen
 Defne Sunguroğlu Hensel
 Jeffrey P. Turko - Current Vice-Chairman

OCEAN Honorary members 

 Prof. Mark Burry
 Prof. Emeritus Dr. George Jeronimidis 
 Prof. Dr. Jolly Monge
 Prof. Dr. Harold Nelson
 Prof. Dr. Tevfik Balcıoğlu

References

External links
 http://www.ocean-designresearch.net
 http://www.systemsorienteddesign.net
 http://www.performanceorienteddesign.net
 https://web.archive.org/web/20180914220640/http://www.membranespaces.net/

Business organisations based in Norway